Kadapiku may refer to several places in Estonia:
Kadapiku, Kadrina Parish, village in Lääne-Viru County, Estonia
Kadapiku, Tapa Parish, village in Lääne-Viru County, Estonia